Hose Station No. 6 is located in a residential neighborhood in the West End of Davenport, Iowa, United States. It has been listed on the National Register of Historic Places since 1983. It is one of two former fire stations in the West End that are still in existence. The other one is Hose Station No. 7.

History
The first group of volunteer firefighters in Davenport were organized in 1856 and called the Independent Fire Engine and Hose Company. The city's first firehouse, Hose Station No. 1, was built on Perry Street in 1877 for the Fire King Engine 2nd Hose Company. Around the turn of the 20th-century, the city built other small hose stations throughout the city such as Hose Station No. 6. The building is now a private home.

Architecture
The fire station was built in the Renaissance Revival style in 1910. The two-story structure follows a rectangular plan, a projecting side bay, and a brick exterior. There is also a short tower in the rear of the building in which the hoses dried. The fire engine entrance features a dogear concrete surround and quoining on the side bay. Rectangular windows are used throughout the building with the pair on the main facade's second floor having modified Gibbs surrounds. The building is capped with a hipped roof with a small curved roof dormer on the front.

References

External links

Fire stations completed in 1910
Buildings and structures in Davenport, Iowa
Defunct fire stations in Iowa
Fire stations on the National Register of Historic Places in Iowa
National Register of Historic Places in Davenport, Iowa
Renaissance Revival architecture in Iowa